The subplate, also called the subplate zone, together with the marginal zone and the cortical plate, in the fetus  represents the developmental anlage of the mammalian cerebral cortex. It was first described, as a separate transient fetal zone by Ivica Kostović and Mark E. Molliver in 1974. 

During the midfetal period of fetal development the subplate zone is the largest zone in the developing telencephalon.  It serves as a waiting compartment for growing cortical afferents; its cells are involved in the establishment of pioneering cortical efferent projections and transient fetal circuitry, and apparently have a number of other developmental roles. The subplate zone is a phylogenetically recent structure and it is most developed in the human brain.

Subplate neurons (SPNs) are among the first generated neurons in the mammalian cerebral cortex . These neurons disappear during postnatal development and are important in establishing the correct wiring  and functional maturation  of the cerebral cortex.
Subplate neurons appear to be selectively sensitive to injury (such as hypoxia) which in humans are associated with motor and cognitive defects .

Subplate neurons are the first cortical neurons to receive synaptic inputs from thalamic axons, establishing a temporary link between thalamic axons and their final target in layer IV.. Later, thalamic axons invade layer IV where they innervate layer IV neurons. In the visual system thalamic axons to layer IV form ocular dominance columns and this segregation of thalamic axons is impaired if subplate neurons are missing .

See also 
Cerebral Cortex
Cortical column
Cerebral hemisphere

References

Developmental neuroscience
Cerebral cortex